Lost in Forever may refer to:

 "Lost in Forever" (song), a 2012 song by P.O.D. from Murdered Love
 Lost in Forever (album), a 2016 album by Beyond the Black